Mohammad Ghorbani (born 24 April 1943) is a retired Iranian flyweight freestyle wrestler who competed in the 1968 Summer Olympics in Mexico City, Mexico and the 1972 Summer Olympics in Munich, Germany. He won the world title (gold) in the 1971 World Wrestling Championships in Sofia, Bulgaria, placed second (silver) in the 1969 World Wrestling Championships in March del Plata, Argentina, and placed third (bronze) in the 1970 World Wrestling Championships in Edmonton, Canada. He also won a gold medal at the 1970 Asian Games in Bangkok, Thailand.

References

External links
 

1943 births
Living people
Olympic wrestlers of Iran
Wrestlers at the 1968 Summer Olympics
Wrestlers at the 1972 Summer Olympics
Iranian male sport wrestlers
Asian Games gold medalists for Iran
Asian Games medalists in wrestling
Wrestlers at the 1970 Asian Games
World Wrestling Championships medalists
Medalists at the 1970 Asian Games
20th-century Iranian people
21st-century Iranian people
World Wrestling Champions